Mount Mẫu Sơn is a mountain in Lộc Bình District, Lạng Sơn Province, in northeastern Vietnam. It is located about 170 km northeast of Hanoi and about 30 km east of Lạng Sơn City close to the international border between Vietnam and China. The highest peak of Mount Mẫu Sơn reaches about 1,600 m above sea level.

Mount Mẫu Sơn was originally settled by the Yao people. In the early 20th century, the French built a military base on the mountain followed by a cluster of villas in 1936. The French installations on Mount Mẫu Sơn have since fallen into disrepair and only ruins remain of the original buildings. The mountain now contains several guest houses built to resemble French villas, some are abandoned, but a few still remain operational as of May 2017. The top of the mountain is a popular picnicking location with locals who come there to take photographs on the mountain top.

References

Mountains of Vietnam
Landforms of Lạng Sơn province